Codex Carolinus is an uncial manuscript of the New Testament on parchment, dated to the 6th or 7th century. It is a palimpsest containing a Latin text written over a Gothic one. The Gothic text is designated by siglum Car, the Latin text is designated by siglum gue (traditional system) or by 79 (on the list of Beuron), it represents the Old Latin translation of the New Testament. It is housed in the Herzog August Library in Wolfenbüttel in Lower Saxony, Germany.

It is one of very few manuscripts of Wulfila's Gothic Bible. The manuscript is fragmentary. The four leaves of the codex were used as raw material for the production of another manuscript – Codex Guelferbytanus 64 Weissenburgensis. It is a palimpsest, and its text has been reconstructed several times. Franz Anton Knittel was the first to examine it and decipher its text.

Description 
The codex has survived to the present day in a very fragmentary condition. It contains only the text of the Epistle to the Romans 11-15 on four parchment leaves (size 26.5 cm by 21.5 cm). The text is written in two parallel columns, 27 lines per column. The left column is in Gothic, the right in Latin.

 Contents 
 Romans 11:33-12:5; 12:17-13:5; 14:9-20; 15:3-13.

The text of the codex is not divided into chapters. The nomina sacra are used both in Gothic and Latin texts (ihm and ihu for "Iesum" and "Iesu"). All the abbreviations are marked with the superscript bar. Its text has some value in Romans 14:14 for Textual Criticism.

It is a palimpsest, the whole book is known as Codex Guelferbytanus 64 Weissenburgensis. The upper text is in Latin, it contains Isidore of Seville's Origines and his six letters. The lower text of the codex belongs to several much earlier manuscripts, such as Codex Guelferbytanus A, Codex Guelferbytanus B, and Codex Carolinus.

History 

The manuscript is dated palaeographically to the 6th century or 7th century. According to Tischendorf it was written in the 6th century. Probably it was written in Italy. Nothing is known about its early history. In the 12th or 13th century four of its leaves were used as material for another book and they were overwritten by Latin text. Its later story is linked with the codices Guelferbytanus A and B.

Formerly the manuscript was held in Bobbio, Weissenburg, Mainz, and Prague. The Duke of Brunswick bought it in 1689.

The manuscript became known to the scholars in the half of the 18th century, where it was found in the Ducal Library of Wolfenbüttel. The first description of the codex was made by Heusinger. 
Franz Anton Knittel (1721–1792) recognized two lower Greek texts of the New Testament in this palimpsest codex, and designated them by A and B, he recognized also the Gothic-Latin text (known later as Codex Carolinus). 
F. A. Knittel deciphered Gothic-Latin text of the Codex Carolinus and published it in 1762 at Brunswick.
In his edition all abbreviated forms, Gothic and Latin, are written in full. It was published in Uppsala in 1763. It was published again by Theodor Zahn.

Knittel made many errors, especially in Latin text, he also did not decipher every word and left several lacunae in the reconstructed text (e.g. Romans 11:35; 12:2; 15:8). Tischendorf made a new and more accurate collation for the Latin text and edited in 1855. Tischendorf used abbreviations for the nomina sacra, he did not leave any lacunae.
The new collation of the Gothic text was given by Carla Falluomini in 1999.

The codex is located at the Herzog August Bibliothek (no. 4148) in Wolfenbüttel.

Samples of reconstructed text (Romans 11:33-12:2)

Gothic  text (folio 277 recto, 1 col.)

Latin text (folio 277 recto, 2 col.)

See also 
 Another manuscript of Gothic Bible
 Codices Ambrosiani
 Codex Argenteus
 Skeireins
 Sortable articles
 Gothic Bible
 List of New Testament Latin manuscripts
 Biblical manuscript
 Textual criticism

References

Further reading 

 George W. S. Friedrichsen, The Gothic Text of Rom. XIV 14 ( τι κοινον ειναι ), in Cod. Guelferbytanus, Weissenburg 64, JTS (Clarendon Press, 1937), pp. 245–247.

External links 

 Text of the codex
 Codex Carolinus — with reconstructed text Gothic and Latin
 Gothic text in Falluomini's reconstruction at the Digitale Edition der Handschrift Cod. Guelf. 64 Weiss
 Sortable articles
 Manuscripts of Gothic Bible at the Wulfila Project
 Digitalized Codex Guelferbytanus Weissenburgensis 64 at the Herzog August Bibliothek — Images 505-508, 549-550, 555-556
 More information at Earlier Latin Manuscripts

Gothic Bible
6th-century biblical manuscripts
Palimpsests
Vetus Latina New Testament manuscripts
Herzog August Library